Jhoan David Rojas Mena (born 13 February 1992) is a Colombian football defender who is currently playing for Upfield SC in Australia.

Career

Club career
In the 2019, Rojas played for Japanese club Esperanza SC. In February 2020, he moved to Australian club Upfield SC.

References

External links

Ascenso Mexican League
Lithuanian Football League

1992 births
Living people
Colombian footballers
Apollon Limassol FC players
Ayia Napa FC players
Deportivo Cali footballers
Cimarrones de Sonora players
FK Nevėžis players
FC Spartaki Tskhinvali players
Cypriot First Division players
Ascenso MX players
Association football defenders
Colombian expatriate footballers
Expatriate footballers in Cyprus
Expatriate footballers in Mexico
Expatriate footballers in Lithuania
Expatriate footballers in Georgia (country)
Expatriate footballers in Japan
Expatriate soccer players in Australia
Colombian expatriate sportspeople in Mexico
Colombian expatriate sportspeople in Cyprus
Colombian expatriate sportspeople in Lithuania
Colombian expatriate sportspeople in Georgia (country)
Colombian expatriate sportspeople in Japan
Colombian expatriates in Australia
Sportspeople from Valle del Cauca Department